Istgah-e Jajarm (also Romanized as Īstgāh-e Jājarm) is a village in Miyan Dasht Rural District, in the Central District of Jajrom County, North Khorasan Province, Iran. At the 2006 census, its population was 237, in 59 families.

References 

Populated places in Jajrom County